Giugni is a surname. Notable persons with that name include:

 Heather Giugni, American filmmaker and politician
 Gino Giugni (1927–2009), Italian academic and politician
 Ugolino Giugni (died 1470), Roman Catholic prelate